Young-jae, also spelled Yeong-jae or Yong-jae, is a Korean masculine given name. Its meaning differs based on the hanja used to write each syllable of the name. There are 34 hanja with the reading "young" and 20 hanja with the reading "jae" on the South Korean government's official list of hanja which may be used in given names.

People with this name include:

Entertainers

Dokgo Young-jae (born Jeon Young-jae, 1953), South Korean actor
Pyo Yeong-jae (born 1972), South Korean voice actor
Lee Hwi-jae (born Lee Young-jae, 1973), South Korean television presenter
Kim Young-jae (actor born 1975), South Korean actor
Yoo Young-jae (born 1994), South Korean singer, member of B.A.P
Kim Young-jae (actor, born 1995), South Korean actor
Choi Young-jae (born 1996), South Korean singer, member of Got7

Sportspeople
Park Yeong-jae (born 1960), South Korean weight lifter
Young-jae Jung (born 1984), South Korean ballet dancer
Cho Young-jae (born 1985), South Korean sledge hockey player
Lee Yeong-jae (born 1994), South Korean football midfielder
Seo Young-jae (born 1995), South Korean football left back

Other
O Yŏng-jae (born 1935), North Korean poet and propaganda author who wrote a poem about Jong-il Peak
Kim Yong-jae (born 1952), North Korean diplomat

Fictional characters
Lee Young-jae, in 2004 South Korean television series Full House
Kim Young-jae, female character in 2018 South Korean television series The Third Charm

See also
List of Korean given names

References

Korean masculine given names